Arlindo Vicente de Assunção Carvalho is a Santomean politician who was the nation's minister of health under Joaquim Rafael Branco.

He visited Taiwan on April 9, 2007 in company with the Taiwanese Minister of Foreign Affairs Yang Tzu-pao and its health minister Hou Sheng-mou., later in July, he visited Brazil.  He was notably headed with the center of endemic diseases, a national program that battled against tuberculosis (TB) in June 2014 as well as against malaria, as director of the centre.

References

Living people
Government ministers of São Tomé and Príncipe
Year of birth missing (living people)